Lukas Skrivanek (born 1 February 1997) is an Austrian football player. He plays for DSV Leoben.

Club career
He made his Austrian Football First League debut for FC Blau-Weiß Linz on 21 July 2017 in a game against FC Wacker Innsbruck.

On 14 August 2020, he signed with Floridsdorfer AC. In the summer 2021, Skrivanek returned to his childhood club DSV Leoben.

References

External links
 

1997 births
People from Leoben
Living people
Austrian footballers
DSV Leoben players
Grazer AK players
SK Sturm Graz players
FC Blau-Weiß Linz players
Kapfenberger SV players
Floridsdorfer AC players
2. Liga (Austria) players
Austrian Regionalliga players
Association football defenders
Footballers from Styria